Aidan Craig Daly (born 22 August 1978) is a New Zealand former basketball player who played 18 seasons in the National Basketball League (NBL), including 12 with the Hawke's Bay Hawks.

High school
Daly attended Napier Boys' High School and Notre Dame Academy.

NBL career
Between 1997 and 2013, Daly played in the National Basketball League (NBL) for the Hawke's Bay Hawks, Wellington Saints, Manawatu Jets and Christchurch Cougars. He returned to the NBL in 2016, re-joining the Hawks to play for his sister, Kirstin, who was appointed the team's head coach. He was subsequently named team co-captain for his return season. It was his final season in the NBL.

In 2022, Daly was appointed an assistant coach of the Hawks.

Personal life
Daly's father, Craig, has previously served as the Hawke's Bay Hawks' team manager.

References

External links
Aidan Daly at australiabasket.com

1978 births
Living people
Christchurch Cougars players
Hawke's Bay Hawks players
Manawatu Jets players
New Zealand men's basketball players
Point guards
Sportspeople from Napier, New Zealand
Wellington Saints players